Abarlaq, also known as Avaleh and Avala, may refer to:
 Abarlaq-e Olya
 Abarlaq-e Sofla